Joe Howarth may refer to:

 Joe Howarth (footballer) (born 1954), English soccer defender
 Joe Howarth (politician) (born 1955), American politician in the New Jersey General Assembly